The 1926 Creighton Bluejays football team was an American football team that represented Creighton University as a member of the North Central Conference (NCC) during the 1926 college football season. In its fourth season under head coach Chet A. Wynne, the team compiled a 4–4–1 record (2–1–1 against NCC opponents) and equaled the scoring of its opponents with 107 point scored and 107 points allowed. The team played its home games at Creighton Stadium in Omaha, Nebraska.

Schedule

References

Creighton
Creighton Bluejays football seasons
Creighton Bluejays football